Events in the year 1936 in India.

Incumbents
 Emperor of India – George V (until 20 January), Edward VIII (until 11 December), George VI
 Viceroy of India – The Earl of Willingdon 
 Viceroy of India – Victor Hope, 2nd Marquess of Linlithgow (from 18 April)

Events 
 National income –  28,912 million
 15–18 October – Religious riots in Bombay.
 28 December – Indian National Congress rejected new constitution.
 Temple Entry Proclamation

Law
 3 March – Legislative Assembly passed a motion to terminate the Ottawa trade agreement.
Payment of Wages Act
Parsi Marriage and Divorce Act

Births
8 January – Jyotindra Nath Dixit, diplomat and politician (died 2005).
12 January – Mufti Mohammad Sayeed, politician and former Chief Minister of Jammu and Kashmir. (died 2016)
1 April
 Tarun Gogoi, former Chief Minister of Assam (died 2020)
 Abdul Qadeer Khan, Pakistani nuclear scientist born in Bhopal (died 2021)
15 July – Prabhash Joshi, writer, editor and political analyst. (died 2009)
21 July –  Muhammad Rafi Usmani, Pakistani Muslim scholar. (died 2022)
3 August – Bannanje Govindacharya, Sanskrit scholar. (died 2020)
9 August – Satish Kumar, peace activist and editor.
13 August – Vyjayanthimala, award-winning actress and classical dancer.
8 September – Indu Jain, media executive and philanthropist (died 2021)
13 November – Suhail Zaheer Lari, Historian, author. (died 2020)
6 December  Savitri, actress and dancer (died 1981).
25 December – Ismail Merchant, film producer (died 2005).

Full date unknown
Anand, writer.

Deaths
13 August – Bhikaiji Cama, independence campaigner (born 1861).
19 September – Vishnu Narayan Bhatkhande, Indian classical musician (born 1860).
8 October – Munshi Premchand, writer in Hindi-Urdu literature and Indian Freedom fighter (born 31 July 1880).

References

 
India
Years of the 20th century in India